Corridor is a 1999 collection of short stories by Alfian Sa'at,  all set in present-day Singapore. It received a Singapore Literature Prize Commendation Award for 1998.  It was first published by SNP Editions in 1999, and republished by Ethos Books in 2015.

Contents
"Project"
"Video"
"Orphans"
"Pillow"
"Corridor"
"Duel"
"Winners"
"Cubicle"
"Umbrella"
"Bugis"
"Birthday"
"Disco"

Awards and nominations
 1998 Singapore Literature Prize Commendation Award

Publication history
 1999, Singapore, Raffles (SNP imprint), paperback
 2015, Singapore, Ethos Books, 978-981-07-7993-1, paperback

References

1999 short story collections
Singaporean short story collections